Tom Richardson (1891 – after 1929) was an English footballer who played as a full back and spent the majority of his career at Worksop Town. He did have a three-year spell in the Football League with Sheffield United but managed only a handful of appearances in that time. He was born in Worksop.

Career
Richardson started his career with Worksop Town, spent a season at Retford Town, and eventually arrived at Sheffield United. He failed to succeed at what was then one of the top sides in the country and made only a couple of appearances in the Football League and a handful more during wartime football.

Richardson had initially worked in Manton Colliery and enlisted in the army during the First World War, he returned to Worksop Town on his discharge where he spend ten years as a mainstay of the side, captaining it for much of that time.

References

1891 births
Footballers from Worksop
English footballers
English Football League players
Association football defenders
Worksop Town F.C. players
Retford Town F.C. players
Sheffield United F.C. players
Year of death missing